The cuisine of Cape Verde is a West African cuisine largely influenced by Portuguese, Southern and Western European and West African cuisine. Cape Verde was a colony of Portugal from its colonization until 1975.

Because the archipelago is inside the Atlantic Ocean, fish is very important in Cape Verdean cooking.

Overview
One of the most important aspects of Cape Verdean culture is the beverage grogue, a strong rum made from distilled sugar cane on the islands of Santo Antao and Santiago. The beverage is made in towns such as Paul on Santo Antao and Cidade Velha on Santiago using a trapiche. A variation of the drink is ponche (punch) which is sweetened with condensed milk or sugarcane molasses. Due to the intoxication on consuming grogue, it is consumed by many Cape Verdean musicians seeking inspiration. 

Corn and beans are staples of Cape Verdean cuisine. Also popular are rice, fried potatoes, cassava and vegetables such as carrots, kale, squash, fish and meat such as tuna, sawfish, lobster, chicken, grilled pork and eggs. One legacy of the Portuguese on the islands is olives and Alentejo wines which are still imported.

Cachupa, a stew, is considered the national dish of Cape Verde which includes mashed maize, onions, green bananas, manioc, sweet potatoes, squash and yams. Manioc balls are one of the most common in Cape Verde.

Seafood dishes include bafa and búzio cabra, made from bubonian conch (Persististrombus latus).

In December 2002, the Cape Verdean government prohibited the killing of turtles by law, per their participation in the Convention on Biological Diversity in 1995 e a Convenção sobre Comercio Internacional de Espécies de Fauna e Flora Selvagem Ameaçadas de Extinção (CITES). The dish once popular on Santiago Island named turtle steak has slowly disappeared.

Strela is Cape Verde's most popular beer. Its production began in 2006; it superseded Portuguese beers including Super Bock and Sagres (in 2009).

Meals
 Manel Antone stew—beef stew
 Antonense shrimp stew (conserva de camarão)—found in Santo Antão
 Antonense pork stew (conserva de carne de porco)—found in Santo Antão
 Arroz de cabidela de marisco а dadal—the rice seafood dish of the island of São Vicente
 Bafa—a snack made of seafood or meat, prepared quickly, as an entrée or as a main dish, usually accompanied by beer, wine, grogue, in a festive manner.
 Bafa—a dish with squid, fries and rice
 Bibi-style shrimp dish (caldo de camarão а moda da mama Bibi—seafood dish mainly originated in Chã das Pedras southwest of Ribeira Grande on the island of Santo Antão
 Búzio cabra—seafood made out of the Bubonian conch (Persististrombus latus), a sea snail
 Cachupa—corn/maize dish, the national dish of Cape Verde, varieties include cachupa frita, cachupa guisada or cachupa refogada, meaning "fried cachupa" and two styles, cachupa rica tends to have more ingredients than the simpler, cachupa pobre.
 Cabrito—young goat
 Caldo de peixe or "Calderado"—a fish dish (usually cavala, mackerel) with potato, pumpkin, carrots, vegetables, served with rice, tomato puree, corn puree
 Carne guizada—beef stew
 Chamuças—Capeverdean samosas dish, a dish originated from the Indian subcontinent
 Couscous—one of the most popular in Cape Verde, the Capeverdean style features a sweet bean-flour and sugar mixture steamed into a cake or bun, commonly eaten with butter and/or drank with coffee during breakfast meals.
 Frango assado—grilled chicken
 Fried moray eel
 Feijoada (a la Cape Verde)—hearty bean stew
 Goat cheese with papaya jam
 Frango assado com tomates—a dish popular on the island of Fogo
 Ervilhas assadas—a dish popular on the island of Fogo
 Grogue or Capeverdean grog—alcoholic (nowadays also non-alcoholic) beverage, popular on the islands of Santo Antão and Santiago
 Guisado de percebes (barnacle stew)—dish of the island of São Vicente
 Lobster stew—Lobster steamed and served with a sauce of choice.
 Lagosta suada—lobster cooked on red sauce.
 Lapas—mussels, stewed limpets and peppers.
 Morreia eel—fried in oil, and often served as a bafa
 Legumes cozidos—cooked vegetables
 Modje de Sao Nicolau—beef stew
 Percebes—sea fingers or gooseneck barnacles, steamed in a large pot, eaten by cracking off the end and peeling the skin to reveal the meat, similar in texture to squid.
 Cracas—barnacle served still clinging to the rock with a slice of lemon and a long thin implement used for hooking out the meat from the shell.
 Polvo—octopus
 Shrimp in garlic wine (camarão em vinha de alhos)
 Turtle steak (bife de tartaruga)—no longer available, once popular on the island of Santiago
 Xerém—a corn dish served with soup.

Beverages
Strela—beer
Several variety of wines from Chã das Caldeiras including Santa Luzia and Brava

Desserts
Bolinhos de mandioca com mel —honey manioc balls

See also

List of African cuisines
West African cuisine

References

Further reading
Virginia Vieira Silva, Cuisine des îles du Cap-Vert (Cuisine of the Cape Verde Islands), Paris: L'Harmattan, 1989, 222 p.

External links
Cape Verde Gastronomy Capeverde.com

 
West African cuisine